Judah Leon Waten AM (29 July 191129 July 1985) was an Australian novelist who was at one time seen as the voice of Australian migrant writing.

Life and career
Born in Odessa to a Russian-Jewish family, Judah Waten arrived in Western Australia in 1914. He attended Christian Brothers' College, Perth and, moving to Melbourne in 1926, University High School, Melbourne. He joined the Communist Party of Australia while still at school. Between 1931 and 1933, he visited Europe, became engaged in left-wing political activities in England, and spent three months in Wormwood Scrubs Prison.

He wrote novels, short stories and a history of the Great Depression in Australia. His best-known work is a collection of autobiographical short stories, Alien Son, first published in 1952. He travelled to the Soviet Union several times, once with Manning Clark. He was involved in the Realist Writers Group, International PEN, the Fellowship of Australian Writers and served on the Literature Board of the Australia Council.

In 1967, he became a member of the National Committee of the Communist Party. However, he left the party in 1972 to join the pro-Soviet Socialist Party of Australia.

In 1985 he died in Melbourne.

Honours and awards
In 1979 he was awarded membership of the Order of Australia.

In 1985 he was posthumously awarded the Patrick White Award.

Bibliography 
Novels
 Alien Son (Angus & Robertson, 1952)
 The Unbending (Australasian Book Society, 1954)
 Shares in Murder (Australasian Book Society, 1957)
 Time of Conflict (Australasian Book Society, 1961)
 Distant Land (F. W. Cheshire, 1964)
 Season of Youth (F. W. Cheshire, 1966)
 So Far No Further (Wren Publishing, 1971)
 Scenes of Revolutionary Life (Angus & Robertson, 1982)

Non-fiction
 The Depression Years, 1929-1939 (F. W. Cheshire, 1971, Australia Since the Camera series)

Memoir
 From Odessa to Odessa: The Journey of an Australian Writer (F. W. Cheshire, 1969)
 "My two literary careers", essay (Southerly, 1971)
 "Why I came home - naked - fifty years ago", essay ([[The Bulletin (Australian periodical)|The Bulletin]], 24 April 1984)

References

Further reading
 David Carter, A Career in Writing: Judah Waten and the Cultural Politics of a Literary Career, Toowoomba: Association for the Study of Australian Literature, 1997
 David Carter, Waten, Judah Leon (1911–1985) at Australian Dictionary of Biography

External links
 Guide to the Papers of Judah Waten (NLA MS 4536), at National Library of Australia 
 WATEN, Judah Leon: Personal files, alpha-numeric series, A6119 from Australian Security Intelligence Organisation held by National Archives of Australia
 WATEN, Judah Leon: Personal files, alpha-numeric series, A6119 (Part 2) from Australian Security Intelligence Organisation held by National Archives of Australia
 Judah Waten interviewed by Hazel de Berg in the Hazel de Berg collection (sound recording) at National Library of Australia
 Judah Waten interviewed by Suzanne Lunney (sound recording) at National Library of Australia - click here to listen
 

1911 births
1985 deaths
Australian communists
Australian memoirists
Australian male novelists
Jewish Australian writers
Jewish Ukrainian writers
Marxist writers
Odesa Jews
University of Melbourne alumni
Members of the Order of Australia
People educated at Christian Brothers' College, Perth
People educated at University High School, Melbourne
Communist writers
Writers from Melbourne
Writers from Perth, Western Australia
20th-century Australian novelists
Communist Party of Australia members
20th-century memoirists
Emigrants from the Russian Empire to Australia